William Beckley may refer to:

 William Beckley (Carmelite) (died 1438), English Carmelite
 William Beckley (actor) (1930–2015), American actor
 Bill Beckley (born 1946), American narrative/conceptual artist